Euphorticus pubescens is a species of beetle in the family Carabidae. It is found in Brazil, Mexico, and North Carolina, United States.

References

Further reading

Harpalinae
Beetles described in 1831
Taxa named by Pierre François Marie Auguste Dejean